Smash Court Tennis Pro Tournament, known in Japan as , is a video game created by Namco for the PlayStation 2 in 2002.

Reception

The game received "average" reviews according to the review aggregation website Metacritic. In Japan, Famitsu gave it a score of 30 out of 40.

See also
Smash Court Tennis Pro Tournament 2
Smash Court Tennis 3

References

External links
 

2002 video games
PlayStation 2 games
PlayStation 2-only games
Tennis video games
Namco games
Bandai Namco Entertainment franchises
Video games developed in Japan